Rising Moon: Setting Sun is the third studio album by American metalcore band Sirens and Sailors. The album was released on August 7, 2015 through Artery Recordings.

Track listing

Personnel
Credits by Allmusic
Sirens and Sailors
 Kyle Bihrle - lead vocals
 Doug Court - drums
 Todd Golder - rhythm guitar, clean vocals
 Jimm Lindsley - lead guitar
 Steven Goupil - bass

Production
 Kellen McGregor - Producer
 Brian Hood - Engineer, mastering, mixing
 Jordon Rigby - Engineer
 Josiah Moore - Art Direction, design

References

2015 albums
Sirens and Sailors albums